Matsya is the first avatar of Vishnu in Hindu mythology.

Matsya can also refer to:
 Matsya (tribe), ancient tribe/kingdom
 Matsya Purana, ancient Hindu text
 Matsya Kingdom, ancient Hindu Kingdom of India
 Matsya Union, part of Unification of Rajasthan

See also
 Matsyendranath, the patron deity of Nepal